Human Harvest is a 2014 documentary film, directed by Vancouver filmmaker Leon Lee, which follows the investigative work by Canadian Nobel Peace Prize nominees David Matas and David Kilgour on whether and how state-run hospitals in China harvested and sold organs, by killing tens of thousands of prisoners of conscience, who are mainly Falun Gong practitioners.

Production
The film is supported by the Canada Media Fund’s Diverse Languages Program, which supports productions on Canadian diversity. The program funds projects in languages other than English, French, or Canadian Aboriginal languages. Human Harvest was produced originally in Mandarin.

In addition to the work by filmmaker Leon Lee, two Canadian film companies contributed to the production of the film: Principal of Flying Cloud Productions in Vancouver, and Toronto-based Mark Media.

Impact

Comments by Peabody Awards judges
According to Peabody Awards judges: 

Peabody Awards winners must receive unanimous support from the 17 members of the Peabody Board of Jurors.

News
On April 7, 2015, Dateline of SBS Australia broadcast the film and urged the Australian Government to do something to help stop illegal organ trade in China. The Sydney Morning Herald reported that the investigators, including David Matas and his colleagues, are "pushing for the perpetrators to stand before the International Criminal Court for crimes against humanity".

In 2015 the Communist Party of China said it would stop harvesting the organs of executed prisoners, an announcement about which the filmmaker Lee is skeptical.

Film companies
It is reported that the two Canadian film companies, which worked on the documentary, will continue to work on other projects, including an in-depth investigation on the controversies around the Confucius Institutes.

Awards
2015, November, AIB Media Excellence Awards, International Investigative Documentary.
2015, April, Peabody Awards.
2015, Salem Film Fest Awards - "The Michael Sullivan Frontline Award for Journalism in a Documentary Film".
2015, Flathead Lake International Cinemafest, "Best Picture-Documentary".
2015, Big Muddy Film Festival, Best Documentary Feature.
2014, Global film Awards, "Humanitarian Awards: Grand Prize".
2014, Dec, Viewster Online Film Festival, 1st Place.
2014, Nov, Canada Hamilton Film Festival, Best Documentary.

See also

Free China: The Courage to Believe
Kilgour–Matas report
Organ harvesting from Falun Gong practitioners in China
Persecution of Falun Gong

References

External links
 
 

2014 films
Canadian documentary films
Documentary films about China
Documentary films about health care
Documentary films about organized crime
Documentary films about crime
Falun Gong
Films critical of communism
Films about organ trafficking
Films about organized crime
Organized crime films based on actual events
Peabody Award-winning broadcasts
English-language Canadian films
2010s English-language films
2010s Canadian films